Goeppertia ornata (syn. Calathea ornata, also called variously striped, pin-stripe, or pin-stripe calathea) is a species of perennial plant in the family known as the prayer plants. It is native to South America (Colombia, Venezuela), and is cultivated in temperate countries as a houseplant.

References

External links
MSU Horticulture

ornata
House plants
Flora of Colombia
Flora of Venezuela
Taxa named by Friedrich August Körnicke